Culbreath Bayou is a neighborhood within the city limits of Tampa, Florida. As of the 2000 census the neighborhood had a population of 290. The ZIP Code serving the neighborhood is 33629.  It was named after Col. Harry Culbreath, who came to Tampa following the Civil War, fleeing his war-torn home state of South Carolina, cultivating oranges and raising cattle on his land.

Geography
Culbreath Bayou boundaries are Watrous Ave. to the north, Dunbar to the east, Neptune St. to the South, and West Shore Boulevard to the west.

Demographics
Source: Hillsborough County Atlas

At the 2000 census there were 290 people and 95 households in the neighborhood. The population density was 5,058/mi2.  The racial makeup of the neighborhood was 96% White, 0% African American, 0% Native American, 0% Asian, 1% from other races, and 2% from two or more races. Hispanic or Latino of any race were 6%.

Of the 290 households 29% had children under the age of 18 living with them, 75% were married couples living together, 7% had a female householder with no husband present, and none were non-families. 15% of households were made up of individuals.

The age distribution was 37% under the age of 18, 6% from 18 to 34, 30% from 35 to 49, 14% from 50 to 64, and 13% 65 or older. For every 100 females, there were 100 males.

The per capita income for the neighborhood was $55,121. About 4% of the population were below the poverty line.

See also
Neighborhoods in Tampa, Florida

References

External links
Culbreath Bayou Homeowners Association

Neighborhoods in Tampa, Florida